Cherry Creek High School (commonly Cherry Creek, Creek, or CCHS) is the oldest of seven high schools in the Cherry Creek School District in the Denver metropolitan area. It is located in Greenwood Village, Colorado, and is one of the largest high schools in the Denver metro area, with an  campus and more than 3,800 students.

Campus

Location
The Cherry Creek High School campus is located in the city of Greenwood Village on East Union Avenue between Yosemite Street and Dayton Street. It is directly across the street from Cherry Creek State Park. Also located on the property are the Cherry Creek School District's West Admissions building, West Maintenance building, and Education Service Center. It is adjacent to the buildings and campus of Campus Middle School and Belleview Elementary School, both of which feed into the high school.

Facilities
The campus contains four buildings (West, Information Center, Fine Arts, and East) with 170 classrooms; eight tennis courts; a baseball diamond; two practice football fields; Stutler Bowl, Creek's stadium; and a challenge course. The West Building, by far the largest of the four, houses two gyms; a swimming pool; a weight room; Shillinglaw Lecture Center; and the West Cafeteria. The Information Center Building has a library and technology center, the Registrar's Office, the Counseling and Post-Grad Center, and another (former) cafeteria. Connected to the IC by the "IC Tunnel", the Fine Arts Building features a large theater, music labs, the debate room, and art labs. The East Building contains a gym and the Attendance and Security offices. The sprawling campus is meant to evoke a large "college-like" feel in order to prepare students for college life.

Demographics
The demographic breakdown of the 3,720 students enrolled in 2018–2019 was:
Male - 50.3%
Female - 49.7%
Native American/Alaska Native - 0.5%
Asian - 12.6%
Black - 3.1%
Hispanic - 12.7%
Native Hawaiian/Pacific Islander - 0.1%
White - 66.5%
Two or more races - 4.6%

17.0% of the students were eligible for free or reduced lunch.

Academics
Cherry Creek High School offers Advanced Placement (AP) exams in 31 subject areas. In 2007, 906 students took 2,374 AP exams, and 87% of the students scored 3 or higher (considered passing). The next year 986 students took 2,240 AP exams, 88% scoring 3 or higher. Creek has been recognized as one of the nation's top high schools for AP participation in math, science, and technology, receiving the 2008 Advanced Placement Siemens Award. Creek is also the only school in Colorado to have offered AP French Literature every year, until the test was discontinued.

Activities
Cherry Creek High School offers more than 100 activity organizations, the majority of which are open to all students. Many are nationally recognized, including the Union Street Journal, Fine Print, the Speech and Debate Team, Amnesty International, Key Club, and Future Business Leaders of America.

The school's DECA chapter took 75 students to the national competition in May 2009, the most students any high school has ever brought to the competition in the history of DECA. The Speech and Debate Team is one of the top twenty in the nation and part of “The 400" society, the top one-half of one percent of the National Speech and Debate Association school speech programs. Cherry Creek hosts an annual Model U.N. competition.

Cherry Creek's Wind Ensemble was selected as a featured ensemble at the 2014 Music For All National Concert Band Festival in Indianapolis, Indiana. In 2014 Cherry Creek was selected as a Grammy Signature School for commitment to music education.

The Union Street Journal has received several awards from the Colorado High School Press Association, including four first-place awards in 2007 for ad design, front-page layout, and editorial writing. The magazine received All-Columbian Honors and a Gold Medalist rating from the Columbia Scholastic Press Association for its work during the 2019-20 school year.

Notable alumni

Academics
 Steven Gubser, professor at Princeton University, first American to win the International Physics Olympiad, received Sloan Fellowship

Media/film

 Neal Baer, executive producer for the television show Law & Order: Special Victims Unit
 Tracey Needham, actress, best known for the television shows Life Goes On and JAG
 Aron Ralston, mountain climber, author, outdoorsman, engineer, and motivational speaker who inspired the movie 127 Hours starring James Franco
 Jessica Rothe, actress, notably in Happy Death Day, Forever My Girl, Valley Girl,  and Utopia
 John Wells, producer for television shows including ER and The West Wing
Alexis Martin Woodall, executive producer for the television show American Horror Story

Music
 Kate & Kacey Coppola, country singer-songwriters
 Ben Levy, double bassist for the Boston Symphony Orchestra and the Boston Pops
 Mieka Pauley, singer-songwriter
 Gregory Stapp, opera singer
 Austin Wintory, film and video game composer of Grammy-nominated soundtrack for Journey

Politics
 Michael Huttner, liberal activist, political consultant, and founder of ProgressNow
 Brad Schneider, congressman from Illinois

Sports
 David Aardsma, Major League Baseball pitcher
 Tom Ashworth, offensive tackle for New England Patriots and Seattle Seahawks
 Josh Bard, former MLB catcher
 J.D. Brookhart, former head football coach at University of Akron
 Bobby Brown, freestyle skier, X Games gold medalist
 John Burke, Major League Baseball pitcher, first-ever draft pick of Colorado Rockies
Cynda Chew, former youth figure skater 
Amy Van Dyken, Olympic swimmer, six-time gold medalist
 Jon Embree, former University of Colorado head football coach
 Matt Iseman, host of Sports Soup
 Brad Lidge, former MLB closer, 2008 World Series champion
 Darnell McDonald, former MLB outfielder
 Donzell McDonald, former MLB player for New York Yankees
 Jill McGill, professional LPGA golfer
Ben Pinkelman, USA Eagles 7's Rugby
 Tyler Polumbus, NFL offensive tackle
Sam Raben (born 1997), soccer player
 Mark Randall, former NBA basketball player, led Kansas Jayhawks to 1991 national championship game
 Mike Reid, PGA golfer, winner of 2005 Senior PGA Championship
 Jim Rooker, former MLB player (Detroit Tigers, Kansas City Royals, Pittsburgh Pirates)
 Michael Ruffin, forward for NBA's Portland Trail Blazers, Washington Wizards, Chicago Bulls
 Jeff Salzenstein (born 1973), tennis player
 Kyle Shanahan, NFL head coach for San Francisco 49ers
 Eve Torres, WWE Diva for Monday Night RAW
 Sean Tufts, former linebacker for Carolina Panthers
 Jonathan Vaughters, former professional cyclist
 Bill Wilkinson, former MLB player (Seattle Mariners)

References

External links 
 

Public high schools in Colorado
Educational institutions established in 1955
Cherry Creek School District
Greenwood Village, Colorado
Schools in Arapahoe County, Colorado
1955 establishments in Colorado